The women's team foil was one of eight fencing events on the fencing at the 1972 Summer Olympics programme. It was the fourth appearance of the event. The competition was held from 7 to 8 September 1972. 53 fencers from 11 nations competed.

Rosters

Results

Round 1

Round 1 Pool A 

Romania and France each defeated Great Britain, 9–7 and 10–6, respectively. The two victors then faced off. Romania won 8–7, with a 44–38 touches advantage making the final bout irrelevant.

Round 1 Pool B

Round 1 Pool C

Elimination rounds

References

Foil team
1972 in women's fencing
Fen